The Historical Museum of Sughd is a regional history museum in Khujand, the second-largest city in Tajikistan and the capital of the country's northernmost province, Sughd. The museum has been built within the Khujand Fortress, reconstructed in 1999 on the southeastern corner of the old city wall. On the northern side of the old city runs the Syr-Darya (historically known as the Jaxartes) River, where tourists can stroll or take a gondola.   

The museum features a wide range of artifacts and displays related to the history of the Sughd Region, including rare Tajiki handwoven rugs, Tajiki embroidery, and costumes. Looking further back in time are dioramas of prehistoric life, modern marble mosaics depicting the life of Alexander of Macedon, who built the most distant of his cities nearby, and a statue of Timur Malik, famous for resisting the Mongol invasion in 1219 and 1220.

References

Museums in Tajikistan
Khujand